Dicranota is a genus of flies in the family Pediciidae.

Species

Subgenus Amalopina Brunetti, 1912
Dicranota delectata Alexander, 1930
Dicranota elegantula (Brunetti, 1912)
Dicranota fumicostata Alexander, 1935
Dicranota hyalipennis Alexander, 1938
Dicranota megaplagiata Alexander, 1933
Dicranota melanoleuca Alexander, 1965
Subgenus Amalopinodes Alexander, 1950
Dicranota phantasma Alexander, 1950
Subgenus Dicranota Zetterstedt, 1838
Dicranota amatrix Alexander, 1965
Dicranota argentea Doane, 1900
Dicranota astigma Alexander, 1954
Dicranota bernardinensis Alexander, 1966
Dicranota bicornigera Savchenko, 1978
Dicranota bimaculata (Schummel, 1829)
Dicranota caesia Alexander, 1933
Dicranota clementi Alexander, 1956
Dicranota cosymbacantha Alexander, 1963
Dicranota crassicauda Tjeder, 1972
Dicranota currani Alexander, 1926
Dicranota diacantha Alexander, 1968
Dicranota divaricata Alexander, 1925
Dicranota fastuosa Alexander, 1963
Dicranota fumipennis Alexander, 1941
Dicranota garhwalensis Alexander, 1960
Dicranota guerini Zetterstedt, 1838
Dicranota impotens Alexander, 1963
Dicranota irregularis Pierre, 1922
Dicranota longisector Alexander, 1960
Dicranota mannheimsi Savchenko, 1972
Dicranota nippoalpina Alexander, 1933
Dicranota nipponica Alexander, 1919
Dicranota notmani Alexander, 1943
Dicranota noveboracensis Alexander, 1914
Dicranota nubecula Alexander, 1933
Dicranota parvella Alexander, 1954
Dicranota polaris (Riedel, 1919)
Dicranota quadrihamata Savchenko, 1977
Dicranota rainierensis Alexander, 1968
Dicranota retrorsa Savchenko, 1972
Dicranota sicaria Alexander, 1947
Dicranota stainsi Alexander, 1948
Dicranota strepens Alexander, 1960
Dicranota tetonicola Alexander, 1945
Dicranota yezoensis Alexander, 1924
Subgenus Euamalopina Alexander, 1950
Dicranota perelegantula Alexander, 1950
Subgenus Eudicranota Alexander, 1934
Dicranota catawbiensis Alexander, 1940
Dicranota circipunctata Alexander, 1949
Dicranota dicranotoides (Alexander, 1924)
Dicranota dione Alexander, 1957
Dicranota notabilis Alexander, 1929
Dicranota pallida Alexander, 1914
Dicranota pallidipes Alexander, 1933
Dicranota perdistincta Alexander, 1940
Dicranota radialis Alexander, 1941
Dicranota sibirica (Alexander, 1925)
Dicranota simplex Alexander, 1938
Dicranota tigriventris Alexander, 1967
Dicranota yonahlossee Alexander, 1941
Subgenus Ludicia Hudson & Vane-Wright, 1969
Dicranota aberrans Savchenko, 1980
Dicranota asignata Alexander, 1964
Dicranota claripennis (Verrall, 1888)
Dicranota clausa Alexander, 1938
Dicranota emarginata (Alexander, 1945)
Dicranota iranensis (Alexander, 1975)
Dicranota lucidipennis (Edwards, 1921)
Dicranota megomma Alexander, 1962
Dicranota metaspectralis Alexander, 1965
Dicranota niphas Alexander, 1962
Dicranota paraspectralis Alexander, 1964
Dicranota perpallida Alexander, 1965
Dicranota reticularis Alexander, 1960
Dicranota spectralis (Brunetti, 1918)
Dicranota subreticularis Alexander, 1964
Dicranota subspectralis Alexander, 1960
Dicranota trichoneura Alexander, 1960
Dicranota trifurcata (Edwards, 1928)
Subgenus Paradicranota Alexander, 1934
Dicranota auripontium Stary & Krzeminski, 1993
Dicranota brevicornis Bergroth, 1891
Dicranota brevitarsis Bergroth, 1891
Dicranota candelisequa Stary, 1981
Dicranota capillata Lackschewitz, 1940
Dicranota carbo Stary, 1998
Dicranota cinerascens Lackschewitz, 1940
Dicranota concavista Savchenko, 1977
Dicranota consimilis Mendl, 1987
Dicranota eucera Osten Sacken, 1869
Dicranota flammatra Stary, 1981
Dicranota fuscipennis Lackschewitz, 1940
Dicranota gracilipes Wahlgren, 1905
Dicranota hirtitergata Savchenko, 1979
Dicranota iowa Alexander, 1920
Dicranota lackschewitziana Mendl, 1988
Dicranota landrocki Czizek, 1931
Dicranota martinovskyi Stary, 1974
Dicranota mikiana Lackschewitz, 1940
Dicranota minuta Lackschewitz, 1940
Dicranota ophidia Alexander, 1975
Dicranota pallens Lackschewitz, 1940
Dicranota parviuncinata Savchenko, 1983
Dicranota pavida (Haliday, 1833)
Dicranota pretiosa Alexander, 1963
Dicranota reitteri Mik, 1882
Dicranota rivularis Osten Sacken, 1860
Dicranota robusta Lundstrom, 1912
Dicranota rorida Lackschewitz, 1940
Dicranota rostrata Mendl, 1987
Dicranota schistacea Lackschewitz, 1940
Dicranota simulans Lackschewitz, 1940
Dicranota spiralis Savchenko, 1980
Dicranota subflammatra Stary, 1998
Dicranota subtilis Loew, 1871
Subgenus Plectromyia Osten Sacken, 1869
Dicranota acuminata Mendl, 1972
Dicranota cascadica Alexander, 1949
Dicranota confusa (Alexander, 1924)
Dicranota engelmannia Alexander, 1943
Dicranota incompleta (Brunetti, 1912)
Dicranota kulshanensis Alexander, 1949
Dicranota lassenensis Alexander, 1964
Dicranota modesta (Osten Sacken, 1869)
Dicranota nooksackiae Alexander, 1949
Dicranota petiolata (Alexander, 1919)
Dicranota reducta (Alexander, 1921)
Dicranota tergata (Alexander, 1926)
Dicranota townesi Alexander, 1940
Subgenus Polyangaeus Doane, 1900
Dicranota maculata (Doane, 1900)
Dicranota megalops Alexander, 1945
Dicranota subapterogyne (Alexander, 1943)
Subgenus Rhaphidolabina Alexander, 1916
Dicranota flaveola (Osten Sacken, 1869)
Subgenus Rhaphidolabis Osten Sacken, 1869
Dicranota akshobya Alexander, 1963
Dicranota angulata Alexander, 1936
Dicranota angustistyla Alexander, 1940
Dicranota arjuna Alexander, 1964
Dicranota atripes (Alexander, 1928)
Dicranota avis (Alexander, 1926)
Dicranota babai Alexander, 1958
Dicranota balarama Alexander, 1961
Dicranota basistylata Alexander, 1958
Dicranota biloba Alexander, 1936
Dicranota brachyneura Alexander, 1960
Dicranota brunettii (Edwards, 1916)
Dicranota cayuga (Alexander, 1916)
Dicranota cazieriana Alexander, 1944
Dicranota chorisa Alexander, 1967
Dicranota commutata Savchenko, 1976
Dicranota complicata Savchenko, 1979
Dicranota consors (Alexander, 1923)
Dicranota denningi Alexander, 1966
Dicranota diprion Alexander, 1964
Dicranota exclusa (Walker, 1848)
Dicranota fascipennis (Brunetti, 1911)
Dicranota fenderi Alexander, 1954
Dicranota ferruginea Savchenko, 1983
Dicranota festa Alexander, 1966
Dicranota flavibasis (Alexander, 1919)
Dicranota forceps (Alexander, 1924)
Dicranota furcistyla Alexander, 1954
Dicranota gibbera (Alexander, 1921)
Dicranota hickmanae Alexander, 1940
Dicranota hoplomera Alexander, 1960
Dicranota idiopyga Alexander, 1953
Dicranota indica (Brunetti, 1912)
Dicranota indra Alexander, 1961
Dicranota integriloba Alexander, 1943
Dicranota kaliya Alexander, 1963
Dicranota khumyarae Alexander, 1960
Dicranota lacteipennis Alexander, 1961
Dicranota laticollis Alexander, 1968
Dicranota luteibasis Alexander, 1966
Dicranota luteola Alexander, 1938
Dicranota macracantha Alexander, 1947
Dicranota major (Alexander, 1917)
Dicranota mesasiatica Savchenko, 1973
Dicranota mexicana Alexander, 1946
Dicranota neoconsors Alexander, 1938
Dicranota neomexicana (Alexander, 1912)
Dicranota nooksackensis Alexander, 1949
Dicranota nuptialis Alexander, 1948
Dicranota obesistyla Alexander, 1960
Dicranota ompoana Alexander, 1945
Dicranota ontakensis Alexander, 1947
Dicranota pallidithorax Alexander, 1935
Dicranota paraconsors Alexander, 1955
Dicranota perlongiseta Alexander, 1966
Dicranota perproducta Alexander, 1965
Dicranota persessilis Alexander, 1954
Dicranota persimilis (Alexander, 1920)
Dicranota plana Alexander, 1934
Dicranota platymera Alexander, 1934
Dicranota polymera Alexander, 1933
Dicranota polymeroides (Alexander, 1914)
Dicranota praecisa Alexander, 1938
Dicranota princeps Alexander, 1950
Dicranota pristis Alexander, 1964
Dicranota profunda Alexander, 1950
Dicranota punctipennis (Edwards, 1928)
Dicranota querula Alexander, 1944
Dicranota rhododendri Alexander, 1966
Dicranota rogersiana (Alexander, 1925)
Dicranota rostrifera Alexander, 1946
Dicranota rubescens (Alexander, 1916)
Dicranota sanctaeluciae Alexander, 1964
Dicranota separata Alexander, 1969
Dicranota serrulifera Alexander, 1950
Dicranota sessilis (Alexander, 1917)
Dicranota setulifera Alexander, 1950
Dicranota shushna Alexander, 1961
Dicranota sinoalpina Alexander, 1933
Dicranota sordida (Brunetti, 1911)
Dicranota spina Alexander, 1933
Dicranota squarrosa Savchenko, 1976
Dicranota stenomera Alexander, 1966
Dicranota stenostyla Alexander, 1963
Dicranota stigma (Alexander, 1924)
Dicranota subconsors (Alexander, 1924)
Dicranota subsessilis (Alexander, 1921)
Dicranota subsordida Alexander, 1935
Dicranota subtumidosa Alexander, 1968
Dicranota tashepa Alexander, 1966
Dicranota tehama Alexander, 1950
Dicranota tenuipes (Osten Sacken, 1869)
Dicranota trichopyga Alexander, 1966
Dicranota trilobulata Alexander, 1958
Dicranota tuberculata Alexander, 1936
Dicranota tumidosa Alexander, 1960
Dicranota unilobata Alexander, 1964
Dicranota uninebulosa Alexander, 1935
Dicranota uniplagia Alexander, 1954
Dicranota vajra Alexander, 1961
Dicranota vanduzeei (Alexander, 1930)
Dicranota vishnu Alexander, 1963
Dicranota vritra Alexander, 1961
Dicranota xanthosoma Alexander, 1944
Dicranota yanoana Alexander, 1958

References

 

Pediciidae
Tipuloidea genera